Ivan Volodymyrovych Pavlov (born 26 September 1998) is a Ukrainian former pairs skater. With his partner, Kateryna Dzitsiuk, he is the 2020 Ukrainian national champion. As a single skater, he is the 2015 European Youth Olympic champion, 2014 NRW Trophy silver medalist, and a two-time Ukrainian national champion. He has competed in the final segment at seven ISU Championships and finished within the top eight at the 2018 World Junior Championships.

Career

Early years 
Pavlov began learning to skate in 2003. He competed on the novice level in the 2010–2011 and 2011–2012 seasons.

2012–2013 season 
Coached by Maryna Amirkhanova, Pavlov debuted on the ISU Junior Grand Prix (JGP) series. He placed eighth at his JGP assignments in France and Turkey and then won junior titles at the Bavarian Open and Ukrainian Junior Championships. Ukraine selected him to compete at the 2013 World Junior Championships in Milan, Italy; he would qualify to the free skate and finish 20th overall.

2013–2014 season 
Pavlov finished eighth and seventh respectively at his JGP assignments in Slovakia and Estonia. After taking the junior silver medal at the 2013 Cup of Nice, he became the Ukrainian national senior bronze medalist. Pavlov was assigned to his second World Junior Championships. He ranked 16th in both segments and finished 15th overall.

2014–2015 season 
During the 2014 JGP series, Pavlov placed seventh in Tallinn, Estonia and fifth in Zagreb, Croatia. Making his senior international debut, he won the silver medal at the NRW Trophy in late November 2014. At the Ukrainian Championships, he ranked first in the short program and second in the free skate, finishing second to Yaroslav Paniot by less than half a point.

In January 2015, Pavlov won gold at the European Youth Olympic Winter Festival in Dornbirn, Austria. In March, he came in 16th at the 2015 World Junior Championships in Tallinn, having placed 21st in the short and 15th in the free. He was coached by Amirkhanova until the end of the season.

2015–2016 season 

Dmytro Shkidchenko began coaching Pavlov in the 2015–2016 season.
Starting his season on the JGP series, Pavlov finished 8th in Bratislava, Slovakia, before winning a bronze medal in Linz, Austria. He then appeared on the senior level, placing 7th at the International Cup of Nice and 5th at his first ISU Challenger Series (CS) event, the 2015 Tallinn Trophy. In December 2015, he placed first in both segments at the Ukrainian Championships and outscored Paniot for the gold medal by 7.42 points.

Pavlov made his senior ISU Championship debut in January 2016 at the European Championships in Bratislava, Slovakia. He qualified for the final segment by placing 13th in the short program and then placed 15th in the free, resulting in a final placement of 15th. Ranked 24th in the short, he also reached the free skate at the 2016 World Championships in Boston.

2016–2017 season 

Competing in the 2016 JGP series, Pavlov placed 4th in Ostrava and 7th in Ljubljana. In the senior ranks, he took gold at Ice Star and finished 7th at the International Cup of Nice. At the Ukrainian Championships, he placed second in the short and first in the free, winning gold by a margin of 0.87 over Paniot.
Pavlov was assigned to two senior-level ISU Championships and qualified to the final segment at the first, the 2017 European Championships in Ostrava, Czech Republic; he placed 15th in the short program, 14th in the free skate, and 14th overall. At the 2017 World Championships in Helsinki, Finland, he placed 25th in the short program, scoring 0.06 less than the final skater who qualified to the free skate. He trained with Shkidchenko until the end of the season.

2017–2018 season 

During the 2017–2018 season, Pavlov was coached by Amirkhanova. In December, he finished second to Paniot at the Ukrainian Championships. In March, he competed at the 2018 World Junior Championships in Sofia, Bulgaria; he placed fourth in the short program, eighth in the free skate with a personal best score, and eighth overall. His placement allows Ukraine to send two entries to the next edition of the event.

Pavlov finished 29th at the 2018 World Championships in Milan, Italy.

2018–2019 season: pair skating 
On 28 May 2018, the Ukrainian Figure Skating Federation announced that he had teamed up with Sofiya Holichenko to compete in pair skating and that the two would be coached by Halyna Kukhar.

2019–2020 season 
Pavlov teamed up with Kateryna Dzitsiuk prior to the season. On the Junior Grand Prix, they placed seventh in Poland and Croatia. At the 2020 Ukrainian Championships, Dzitsiuk/Pavlov won the senior national title ahead of Victoria Bychkova / Ivan Khobta	and Sofiia Nesterova / Artem Darenskyi, but Dzitsiuk was too young to be assigned to senior events. They instead were sent to the 2020 World Junior Championships, where they finished 12th.

After the World Junior Championships, the Ukrainian Figure Skating Federation announced the suspension of Dzitsiuk/Pavlov, as well as their mothers, Alla Dzitsiuk and Alla Pavlova, due to "gross violation of discipline at the World Junior Championships." As a result, they were no longer allowed to represent Ukraine at international events, receive funding from the federation, or train at national team rinks.

Dzitsiuk/Pavlov originally wanted to keep skating together under a different federation, but were also open to separating and representing different countries. However, the onset of the COVID-19 pandemic limited opportunities for try outs and negotiations. 

Pavlov announced his retirement on 2 January 2021. He plans to work as a skating coach.

Programs

Competitive highlights 
CS: Challenger Series; JGP: Junior Grand Prix

Pair skating with Dzitsiuk

Pair skating with Holichenko

Men's singles

References

External links 
 

1998 births
Ukrainian male single skaters
Living people
Sportspeople from Kyiv
Ukrainian male pair skaters
Competitors at the 2017 Winter Universiade